is a Japanese American food consisting of broiled strips of meat marinated in teriyaki sauce and rolled with scallions (negi). Originally, beef was used as the protein, but other types of protein, such as chicken, are now commonly used in negimaki.

History

The dish originated in Manhattan in the 1960s at Restaurant Nippon after the New York Times food critic Craig Claiborne suggested that something with beef was needed to appeal to the American diner. According to the dish's inventor, Nobuyoshi Kuraoka, it was a variation of a dish traditionally made with bluefin tuna.

References 

Japanese cuisine